Richard Agustín Rodríguez (born March 4, 1990) is a Dominican professional baseball pitcher in the Miami Marlins organization. He previously played in Major League Baseball (MLB) for the Baltimore Orioles, Pittsburgh Pirates, and Atlanta Braves.

Career

Houston Astros
On May 26, 2010, Rodríguez began his professional career by signing with the Houston Astros organization, and was assigned to the DSL Astros. He spent 2011 in the DSL and with the GCL Astros. He spent 2012 with the Greeneville Astros, GCL Astros, and Lexington Legends. In 2013, he played for Greeneville, the Quad Cities River Bandits, and Tri-City ValleyCats. In 2014, he spent time with the Bandits, Lancaster JetHawks, Oklahoma City RedHawks, and Corpus Christi Hooks. He began the 2015 season with the Fresno Grizzlies.

Baltimore Orioles
On June 25, 2015, Rodríguez was acquired by the Orioles from the Houston Astros for a player to be named later or cash. He spent the rest of the 2015 season with the Bowie Baysox and the Norfolk Tides. Rodriguez spent the entire 2016 season with Norfolk and was invited to Spring Training for the 2017 season. He did not make the club and was reassigned to the Tides. He was called up to the majors for the first time on September 1, 2017. Rodríguez was designated for assignment by the Orioles on September 17 and outrighted the same day. He elected free agency on November 6, 2017.

Pittsburgh Pirates

On December 8, 2017, Rodríguez signed a minor league contract with the Pittsburgh Pirates. He began the 2018 season with the Indianapolis Indians of the Class AAA International League, and was promoted to the major leagues on April 13. In his first season as a Pirate, he went 4–3 with a 2.47 ERA in 63 games. He struck out 88 batters in  innings.

In 2019, he went 4–5 with a 3.72 ERA, striking out 63 batters in  innings. He made 72 appearances, the most on the team among pitchers. In 2020 for Pittsburgh, Rodríguez pitched to a 3-2 record with a 2.70 ERA, 34 strikeouts, and 4 saves in 23.1 innings of work.

Atlanta Braves
On July 30, 2021, Rodriguez was traded to the Atlanta Braves in exchange for Bryse Wilson and Ricky DeVito. Between the two teams, he was 5-4 with 14 saves and a 2.94 ERA, as in 64 relief appearances he pitched 64.1 innings with an 0.933 WHIP. The Braves finished with an 88-73 record, clinching the NL East, and eventually won the 2021 World Series, giving the Braves their first title since 1995.
On November 30, Rodríguez was non-tendered by the Braves, making him a free agent. 

On April 4, 2022, Rodríguez was suspended by MLB for 80 games after violation of their Joint Drug Prevention and Treatment Program, testing positive for Boldenone.

New York Yankees
On June 21, 2022, Rodríguez signed a minor league deal with the New York Yankees. Rodríguez made 17 appearances for the Triple-A Scranton/Wilkes-Barre RailRiders, pitching to a 3-1 record and 3.86 ERA with 21 strikeouts in 22.1 innings of work. He elected free agency following the season on November 10, 2022.

Miami Marlins
On February 28, 2023, Rodríguez signed a minor league contract with the Miami Marlins organization that included an invitation to Spring Training.

References

External links

1990 births
Living people
Águilas Cibaeñas players
Atlanta Braves players
Baltimore Orioles players
Bowie Baysox players
Corpus Christi Hooks players
Dominican Republic expatriate baseball players in the United States
Dominican Republic sportspeople in doping cases
Dominican Summer League Astros players
Fresno Grizzlies players
Greeneville Astros players
Gulf Coast Astros players
Indianapolis Indians players
Lancaster JetHawks players
Lexington Legends players
Major League Baseball players from the Dominican Republic
Major League Baseball pitchers
Norfolk Tides players
Oklahoma City RedHawks players
Pittsburgh Pirates players
Quad Cities River Bandits players
Tri-City ValleyCats players
People from Santiago de los Caballeros